Jabardasth is a 2013 Telugu-language romantic comedy film written and directed by Nandini Reddy under the banner of Sri Sai Ganesh Productions. It stars Siddharth and Samantha Ruth Prabhu with Nithya Menen in an important role. The film released on 22 February 2013 and was commercially successful at the box office.

The film is heavily inspired by 2010 Hindi film Band Baaja Baaraat. Yash Raj Films, producers of the Hindi film, claimed that Jabardasth is an unofficial remake and planned to take legal action against its makers.

Plot 

This movie shows how business partners fell in love gradually.

Cast

 Siddharth as Bairraju
 Samantha Ruth Prabhu as Shreya
 Nithya Menen as Saraswati
 Srihari as Javed Ibrahim
 Sayaji Shinde as Bihar Yadav
 Pragathi as Shreya's mother
 Thagubothu Ramesh as Ramesh
 Vennela Kishore as Software Subramanyam
 Suresh as Vamshi Krishna
 Arjunan
 Dharmavarapu Subramanyam
 Telangana Shakuntala
 Dhanraj
 Y. Kasi Viswanath
 Nalla Venu
 Duvvasi Mohan
 Kadambari
 Geeta Bhagat
 Sushma
Seeta Reddy
 Swapnika Reddy
 Prince Cecil as cameo appearance

Soundtrack

The film's audio was launched on 1 February 2013. It was attended by Surender, Samantha, Thaman, Siddharth, Srihari and Sunil with V. V. Vinayak being the chief guest.

Release
The film's satellite and audio telecast rights were sold for  5.25 crores.

Critical reception

Reception
Idlebrain.com's Jeevi gave a rating of 3/5 for the film. Rediff wrote:"First half was fun but second half was dragged".

References

External links
 

2013 films
Indian romantic comedy films
Films scored by Thaman S
2010s Telugu-language films
Films about Indian weddings
Films directed by B. V. Nandini Reddy
2013 romantic comedy films